Victoria Alonso (born 22 December 1965) is an Argentine film producer and who formerly served as the President of Physical, Post Production, VFX and Animation at Marvel Studios.

Early life and career 
Alonso was born in La Plata, Buenos Aires Province, Argentina. She moved to Seattle
at the age of 19 to pursue an acting career. She relocated again to Los Angeles, where she began working in the visual effects industry, including at Digital Domain as a visual effects producer for four years, working on films such as Big Fish (2003), which was nominated for Best Special Visual Effects at the 57th British Academy Film Awards.

Alonso joined Marvel Studios in 2005 as executive vice president of visual effects and postproduction, working as a co-producer on Marvel Cinematic Universe films Iron Man (2008), Iron Man 2 (2010), Thor (2010), and Captain America: The First Avenger (2011), and serving as executive producer on every Marvel Studios production since The Avengers (2012), including television shows. She was promoted to Executive Vice President of Production in 2015. In 2021, Alonso was promoted to President of Physical, Post Production, VFX and Animation at Marvel Studios. In 2023, Alonso exited from her role at Marvel Studios. No reason was given for her departure. 

In 2016, Alonso became the first woman to win the Advanced Imaging Society's Harold Lloyd Award for her achievements in visual effects. In January 2020, she was awarded the Filmmaker Award by the Motion Picture Sound Editors at the 67th Golden Reel Awards. In October 2021, it was announced that Alonso would be the top honoree at Outfest's Visionary Award at the November ceremony at LA's Academy Museum of Motion Pictures.

In December 2022, she was named on The Hollywood Reporters "Women in Entertainment Power 100".

Personal life 
Alonso is openly gay and is married to Australian actress Imelda Corcoran. The couple has one daughter.

Filmography

Feature films

Television

Accolades

References

External links 
 

1965 births
American film studio executives
American women film producers
Argentine emigrants to the United States
Disney executives
LGBT film producers
Living people
Marvel Studios people
People from Buenos Aires
LGBT women
Argentine LGBT entertainers